In six-dimensional geometry, a cantellated 6-orthoplex is a convex uniform 6-polytope, being a cantellation of the regular 6-orthoplex.

There are 8 cantellation for the 6-orthoplex including truncations. Half of them are more easily constructed from the dual 5-cube

Cantellated 6-orthoplex

Alternate names
 Cantellated hexacross
 Small rhombated hexacontatetrapeton (acronym: srog) (Jonathan Bowers)

Construction 
There are two Coxeter groups associated with the cantellated 6-orthoplex, one with the B6 or [4,3,3,3,3] Coxeter group, and a lower symmetry with the D6 or [33,1,1] Coxeter group.

Coordinates 
Cartesian coordinates for the 480 vertices of a cantellated 6-orthoplex, centered at the origin, are all the sign and coordinate permutations of
 (2,1,1,0,0,0)

Images

Bicantellated 6-orthoplex

Alternate names
 Bicantellated hexacross, bicantellated hexacontatetrapeton
 Small birhombated hexacontatetrapeton (acronym: siborg) (Jonathan Bowers)

Construction 
There are two Coxeter groups associated with the bicantellated 6-orthoplex, one with the B6 or [4,3,3,3,3] Coxeter group, and a lower symmetry with the D6 or [33,1,1] Coxeter group.

Coordinates 
Cartesian coordinates for the 1440 vertices of a bicantellated 6-orthoplex, centered at the origin, are all the sign and coordinate permutations of
 (2,2,1,1,0,0)

Images

Cantitruncated 6-orthoplex

Alternate names
 Cantitruncated hexacross, cantitruncated hexacontatetrapeton
 Great rhombihexacontatetrapeton (acronym: grog) (Jonathan Bowers)

Construction 
There are two Coxeter groups associated with the cantitruncated 6-orthoplex, one with the B6 or [4,3,3,3,3] Coxeter group, and a lower symmetry with the D6 or [33,1,1] Coxeter group.

Coordinates 
Cartesian coordinates for the 960 vertices of a cantitruncated 6-orthoplex, centered at the origin, are all the sign and coordinate permutations of
 (3,2,1,0,0,0)

Images

Bicantitruncated 6-orthoplex

Alternate names
 Bicantitruncated hexacross, bicantitruncated hexacontatetrapeton
 Great birhombihexacontatetrapeton (acronym: gaborg) (Jonathan Bowers)

Construction 
There are two Coxeter groups associated with the bicantitruncated 6-orthoplex, one with the B6 or [4,3,3,3,3] Coxeter group, and a lower symmetry with the D6 or [33,1,1] Coxeter group.

Coordinates 
Cartesian coordinates for the 2880 vertices of a bicantitruncated 6-orthoplex, centered at the origin, are all the sign and coordinate permutations of
 (3,3,2,1,0,0)

Images

Related polytopes

These polytopes are part of a set of 63 uniform 6-polytopes generated from the B6 Coxeter plane, including the regular 6-cube or 6-orthoplex.

Notes

References
 H.S.M. Coxeter:
 H.S.M. Coxeter, Regular Polytopes, 3rd Edition, Dover New York, 1973
 Kaleidoscopes: Selected Writings of H.S.M. Coxeter, edited by F. Arthur Sherk, Peter McMullen, Anthony C. Thompson, Asia Ivic Weiss, Wiley-Interscience Publication, 1995,  
 (Paper 22) H.S.M. Coxeter, Regular and Semi Regular Polytopes I, [Math. Zeit. 46 (1940) 380-407, MR 2,10]
 (Paper 23) H.S.M. Coxeter, Regular and Semi-Regular Polytopes II, [Math. Zeit. 188 (1985) 559-591]
 (Paper 24) H.S.M. Coxeter, Regular and Semi-Regular Polytopes III, [Math. Zeit. 200 (1988) 3-45]
 Norman Johnson Uniform Polytopes, Manuscript (1991)
 N.W. Johnson: The Theory of Uniform Polytopes and Honeycombs, Ph.D.
  x3o3x3o3o4o - srog, o3x3o3x3o4o - siborg, x3x3x3o3o4o - grog, o3x3x3x3o4o - gaborg

External links 
 Polytopes of Various Dimensions
 Multi-dimensional Glossary

6-polytopes